The 1967 World Cup took place 9–12 November at the Club de Golf Mexico in Mexico City, Mexico. It was the 15th World Cup event, which was named the Canada Cup until 1966 and changed its name to the World Cup in 1967. The tournament was a 72-hole stroke play team event with 40 teams. Each team consisted of two players from a country. The combined score of each team determined the team results. The American team of Jack Nicklaus and Arnold Palmer won by 13 strokes over the New Zealand team of Bob Charles and Walter Godfrey. The individual competition was won by Palmer.

Teams

(a) denotes amateur

Scores
Team

International Trophy

Sources:

References

World Cup (men's golf)
Golf tournaments in Mexico
Sports competitions in Mexico City
World Cup
World Cup golf
World Cup golf